Vance Mueller (born May 5, 1964) is a retired American football running back.

Professional career
Mueller played for the National Football League's Los Angeles Raiders. Vance Mueller was drafted by the Los Angeles Raiders in the fourth round of the NFL Draft in 1986, he was the 103rd player taken in the draft. He played from 1986-1991.

College career
Mueller played college football at Occidental College.

High school career
Mueller prepped at Jackson, CA High School.

References

External links

Raider Drive page

1964 births
Living people
Occidental Tigers football players
Players of American football from Tucson, Arizona
American football running backs
Los Angeles Raiders players
People from Jackson, California